Kate Orman (born 1968 in Sydney, New South Wales, Australia) is an Australian author, best known for her books connected to the British science-fiction television series Doctor Who.

Biography
Orman was born in Sydney, but grew up in Canberra and Melbourne and spent two years living in the United States. She earned a degree in biology at Sydney University before becoming a professional author. She is a self-described "liberal feminist". She is married to American writer Jonathan Blum, whom she met through Doctor Who fandom.

Writing
Orman penned many spin-off novels from Doctor Who for Virgin Publishing, BBC Books and Telos Publishing, the first non-British and first female author to do so. Several of her later Doctor Who works were in collaboration with her husband. She has also collaborated with Paul Cornell: Orman and Cornell co-plotted Human Nature, written by Cornell, and Return of the Living Dad, written by Orman. More recent Doctor Who and related work has been for Big Finish.

Orman has also had a number of short science fiction stories published.

In 2004, Orman and Blum's Doctor Who novella Fallen Gods, published by Telos the previous year, won the Aurealis Award for best Australian science-fiction book.

Novels

Virgin New Adventures
 The Left-Handed Hummingbird (1993)
 Set Piece (1995)
 SLEEPY (1996)
 Return of the Living Dad (1996)
 The Room with No Doors (1997)
 So Vile a Sin (with Ben Aaronovitch, 1997)

"Benny" New Adventures
Walking to Babylon (1998, later adapted into an audio drama by Big Finish)

Eighth Doctor Adventures
 Vampire Science (with Jonathan Blum, 1997)
 Seeing I (with Jonathan Blum, 1998)
 Unnatural History (with Jonathan Blum, 1999)
 The Year of Intelligent Tigers (2001)

Past Doctor Adventures
 Blue Box (2003)

Telos Doctor Who novellas
 Fallen Gods (with Jonathan Blum, 2003)

Novellas
 "All Mimsy Were the Borogoves" in Nobody's Children

Short stories
 "No-One Goes to Halfway There" (in Decalog 4, 1997)
 "The Bicycle Net" (in Interzone, September 1997)
 "The Adventures of Kate Orman, Novelist" (in Pretext: Salvage, 1999)
 "Steal from the World" in The Dead Men Diaries, 2000)
 "Cactus Land" (in Realms of Fantasy, August 2000)
 "Pyramid Scheme" (in Outside the Box: the Best Short Fiction from Bookface.com, 2001)
 "And All the Children of Chimaera" (in Passing Strange, 2002)
 "Ticket to Backwards" (in Agog! Fantastic Fiction, 2002)
 "Solar Max and the Seven-Handed Snake Mother" (in Bernice Summerfield: A Life of Surprises, 2002)
 "In the Days of the Red Animals" (in Agog! Terrific Tales, 2003)
 "The Peter Principle" (in Bernice Summerfield: Life During Wartime, 2003)
 "No Exit" (in Doctor Who - Short Trips: Steel Skies, 2003)
 "The Southwell Park Mermaid" (in Doctor Who - Short Trips: Life Science, 2004)
 "Buried Alive" (in Bernice Summerfield: A Life Worth Living, 2004)
 "Culture War" (in Doctor Who - Short Trips: 2040, 2004)
 "Nobody's Gift" (in Doctor Who - Short Trips: The History of Christmas, 2005)
 "White on White" (in Doctor Who - Short Trips: Christmas Around the World, 2009)
 "Playing for Time" (in Liberating Earth, 2015)

Comics
 "Change of Mind" (in Doctor Who Magazine #221-223, 1995)

Editor

 Liberating Earth, Obverse Books, 2015)

References

External links

1968 births
Australian science fiction writers
Australian women writers
Living people
University of Sydney alumni
Writers of Doctor Who novels
Women science fiction and fantasy writers